Xou da Xuxa Seis is the ninth studio album and the seventh in Portuguese by Brazilian singer and TV host Xuxa Meneghel, released on September 12, 1991 by Som Livre. This album was the sixth album in the "Xou da Xuxa" collection, which totals seven. In this album are included songs like "O Xou da Xuxa Começou", "Novo Planeta" and "Hoje é Dia de Folia". The album sold more than 1 million copies.

Production 
The studio album contains two re-recordings of international songs: "Não Basta", a version of "No Basta" by the Venezuelan singer and composer Franco De Vita and "Bom Dia", which was recorded years before by the country duo Chitãozinho and Xororó.

A great curiosity of the album, is that the song "Hoje é Dia de Folia", had its first chorus cut due to lack of space in the LP (being of the duration of 3:15), the integral version of the song, was only launched in the third official Brazilian compilation of Xuxa, the Pérolas (with the duration of 4:16).

Contrary to popular belief, Xou da Xuxa Seis chosen photos for the cover and back cover of Xuxa Seis are from the rehearsal for the studio album Xuxa 5 (1990). These same photos were even published in the international magazine Paula in October 1990.

So that the public did not confuse with its album in Spanish language Xuxa 2 that had been released shortly before and had the same cover, was inserted a Brazilian flag in the cover of Xuxa Seis.

Xou da Xuxa Seis was produced by Max Pierre, Michael Sullivan and Paulo Massadas, with artistic coordination Marlene Mattos and Xuxa.

Release and reception
Xou da Xuxa Seis released on September 12, 1991 by Som Livre, in CD, cassette and LP formats. The album sold more than a million copies in Brazil, the second with less sales of Xuxa's Xou collection. In 1992, was launched in Uruguay in cassette version, but without authorization, being a bootleg. The album was reissued in 2013 by Som Livre in partnership with Xuxa Produções. The disc is part of the collection box Xou da Xuxa.

Promotion
In addition to singing the songs in the television program, Rede Globo's programming featured an album commercial in two versions: one of 15 and another of 30 seconds. In fact, this commercial was starring actress Deborah Secco. Posters announcing the release of the album were spread across several cities in Brazil. Xuxa also toured Brazil and international based on the Xou Seis and Xuxa 91.

Track listing

Personnel
Produced: Max Pierre, Michael Sullivan and Paulo Massadas
Artistic Coordination: Marlene Mattos and Xuxa Meneghel
Recording Technician: Jorge 'Gordo' Guimarães (bases and keyboards), Luiz G. D 'Orey
Studio Assistants and Mixing: Cezar Barbosa, Ivan Carvalho, Roberta Rodrigues, Julio Carneiro, Claudio Oliveira and Sergio Rocha
Mixing: Jorge 'Gordo' Guimarães
Photos: Paulo Rocha
Arrangement: Jorge 'Jorginho' Corrêa
Illustration (insert): Reinaldo Waisman
Edition of tape: Jorge 'Gordo' Guimarães
Costume Designer: Sandra Bandeira
Recorded in the studios: Som Livre (Rio de Janeiro)
Hair: Márcia Elias
Musician: Roberto Fernandes

Certifications

References

External links 
 Xou da Xuxa Seis at Discogs

1991 albums
Xuxa albums
Som Livre albums
Portuguese-language albums